The 2020–21 FC Tambov season was Tambov's second season in the Russian Premier League, the highest tier of association football in Russia. They finished the season in 16th position, being relegated back to the Russian Football National League, and were knocked out of the Russian Cup by eventual champions Lokomotiv Moscow in the Round of 16.

Season events
On 1 August 2020, Shelia left Tambov to sign for Akhmat Grozny. 

On 3 August, Tambov announced the signing of Sergey Ryzhikov to a one-year contract, whilst Aleksandre Karapetian and Vitaliy Balashov joined on two-year contracts.

On 23 February, David Toshevski joined Tambov on loan from Rostov for the remainder of the season.

Squad

Out on loan

Transfers

In

Loans in

Out

Loans out

Released

Friendlies

Competitions

Overview

Premier League

League table

Results summary

Results by round

Results

Russian Cup

Round of 32

Round of 16

Squad statistics

Appearances and goals

|-
|colspan="14"|Players away from the club on loan:

|-
|colspan="14"|Players who appeared for Tambov but left during the season:

|}

Goal scorers

Clean sheets

Disciplinary record

References

FC Tambov seasons
Tambov